Big Spring Independent School District is a public school district based in Big Spring, Texas (USA).

Academic achievement
In 2011, the school district was rated "academically unacceptable" by the Texas Education Agency.

In 2014, the school district was rated "Improvement Required" by the Texas Education Agency.

In 2015, the school district was rated "Accredited-Probation" by the Texas Education Agency, which means that the district exhibits deficiencies in performance that, if not addressed, will lead to revocation of the district's accreditation status.

Schools
Big Spring High School (Grades 9-12)
Anderson Accelerated High School (Grades 9-12)
Big Spring Junior High (Grades 7-8)
Big Spring Intermediate (Grades 5-6)
Goliad Elementary (Grade 4)
Kentwood Early Childhood Center (PK)
Marcy Elementary (Grades K-2)
Moss Elementary (Grades K-2)
Washington Elementary (Grade 3)

See also

List of school districts in Texas

References

External links

School districts in Howard County, Texas